Canelinha is a municipality in the state of Santa Catarina in the South region of Brazil. It has an altitude of 17 metres and its population according to the 2020 estimate is 12,398 inhabitants. It has land area of 151.409 km ². The municipality was established on 23 December 1962.

Economy
Canelinha is noted for its ceramics and its large number of potteries, an industry which is very important to the local economy. It also produces clothing, knitwear, shoes, and agricultural products. The locality of Areão in the municipality also contains a motocross track, the Motódromo Arthur Jachovicz, which is a venue for the Campeonatos Catarinense e Brasileiro de motocross.

See also
List of municipalities in Santa Catarina

References

External links
Official site 

Municipalities in Santa Catarina (state)